Lungser Kangri is a mountain located in Ladakh, India. 

The mountain is located near the lake Tso Moriri and the village Karzok. The mountain is accessible from Markha Valley. It has been described as relatively easy to climb considering how high it is, not requiring crampons or ice axes.

References 

Six-thousanders of the Transhimalayas
Mountains of India